The 1971 Chico State Wildcats football team represented Chico State College—now known as California State University, Chico—as a member of the Far Western Conference (FWC) during the 1971 NCAA College Division football season. Led by fourth-year head coach Pete Riehlman, Chico State compiled an overall record of 9–2 with a mark of 5–1 in conference play, sharing the FWC title with UC Davis. At the end of the regular season, the Aggies were invited to play in the Camellia Bowl, where they lost to Boise State, 32–28. This was the only postseason bowl game in the history of the Chico State Wildcats football program. The team outscored its opponents 394 to 164 for the season. The Wildcats played home games at College Field in Chico, California. This was the last year the stadium was named College Field. With the school's change to University status in 1972, the stadium was renamed "University Stadium".

Schedule

Team players in the NFL
The following Chico State players were selected in the 1972 NFL Draft.

Notes

References

Chico State
Chico State Wildcats football seasons
Northern California Athletic Conference football champion seasons
Chico State Wildcats football